Eddo can refer to:

People

Family name 
Eddo, bishop of Chur
Walid Eido, Lebanese politician

First name 
Eddo Brandes, cricket player

Nickname 
Eddie Winslow, actor
Mark Edmondson, tennis player

Other uses 
Eddoe, also known as eddo, a tropical vegetable (Colocasia esculenta)

See also
 Edo (disambiguation)